Mare is a surname. Notable people with the surname include:

 Aline Mare (born 1961), American artist and filmmaker
 André Mare (1885–1932), French painter and designer
 Olindo Mare (born 1973), American football placekicker

See also
 Maren (name)